Bansenshūkai (Ten Thousand Rivers Flowing Together to form an Ocean) is a Japanese book containing a collection of knowledge from the clans in the Iga and Kōga regions that had been devoted to the training of ninja. Bansenshūkai summarizes the main points of the three volumes of the original Ninjutsu book Kanrinseiyō (間林清陽), and was written by selecting only those that fit the times. In the beginning of Bansenshūkai, the existence of the original text Kanrinseiyō was mentioned, but its existence had not been confirmed for a long time. However, in June 2022, a manuscript of the second volume of Kanrinseiyō copied in 1748 was found.

It was compiled by Fujibayashi Yasutake in 1676, in the early years of the Tokugawa shogunate, to preserve the knowledge that had been developed during the near-constant military conflict from the Ōnin War until the end of the Siege of Osaka almost 150 years later. As well as information on military strategy and weapons, it has sections on the astrological and philosophical beliefs of the times, and along with the Shōninki of 1681 and the Ninpiden of 1560 make up the three major sources of direct information about this shadowy profession.

Contents

The books include:

 Two volumes of thought and philosophy
 Four volumes on leadership
 Three volumes on Yo-nin—open disguise
 Five volumes on In-nin—hidden infiltration
 Two volumes on astrology
 Five volumes on tools and weapons

Versions
There are two versions:

 The Koga Version has twenty-two chapters bound in ten volumes, with an additional one volume attached to it.
 The Iga Version has twenty-two chapters bound in twelve volumes with an additional four chapters in four volumes attached to it.

Copies
After World War II, a limited number of handwritten copies were offered to the public.  A few of these copies are in some major national and university libraries.  It has recently been re-translated in various languages including English, French, German, and Japanese.

References

Bibliography 
 Antony Cummins & Yoshie Minami, trans. The Book of Ninja: The first complete translation of the Bansenshukai. London: Watkins, 2013. 
 Bansenshûkai: le traité des dix mille rivières, Fujibayashi Yasutake, Axel Mazuer, Albin Michel, May 2013.

External links

Bansenshukai in French
Downloadable Bansenshukai
Bansenshukai online

Edo-period works
Ninjutsu artefacts
Martial arts books